The Victoria County Court House is a historic building in Baddeck, Nova Scotia.

History

In 1851, Victoria County was split off from Cape Breton County, leaving the new county without a court house of its own. The court house was constructed in 1889 by Phillip MacRae, a carpenter from Big Baddeck.  The building was recognized as a historic property in 1989, under the Nova Scotia Heritage Property Act.

Design
The court house is a two-story building constructed in the Classical Revival style with a hipped roof and built of granite and wooden clapboard. The building was originally asymmetrical in design, with a centre block and east wing; a western wing was added in 1967.

See also
Historic Buildings in Baddeck, Nova Scotia
History of Baddeck

References

Buildings and structures in Victoria County, Nova Scotia
Tourist attractions in Victoria County, Nova Scotia
Heritage sites in Nova Scotia